GSK may refer to:
Galatasaray S.K.,  a Turkish sports club based in Istanbul
 Glycogen synthase kinase
 Golden State Killer, a California serial rapist and murderer
 GSK plc, formerly GlaxoSmithKline, a multinational pharmaceutical corporation 
 GTK Scene Graph Kit, a rendering pipeline